Wojciech Tadeusz Pomajda (born August 18, 1968 in Przemyśl) is a Polish politician. He was elected to the Sejm on September 25, 2005 receiving 6622 votes in the 22nd Krosno district. Pomajda was the candidate of the party Democratic Left Alliance.

See also
Members of Polish Sejm 2005-2007

External links
Wojciech Pomajda - parliamentary page - includes declarations of interest, voting record, and transcripts of speeches.

1968 births
Living people
People from Przemyśl
Democratic Left Alliance politicians
Members of the Polish Sejm 2005–2007
Members of the Polish Sejm 2007–2011